Lahul Lohar is an unclassified Indo-Aryan language of northern India. It is spoken by about 750 people in the Lahul region of Himachal Pradesh and in the adjoining Leh district of Ladakh. It is distinct from Gade Lohar, though culturally similar.

References

Languages of Himachal Pradesh
Unclassified Indo-Aryan languages
Endangered languages of India